Terry George (born 14 March 1965) is a British businessman known primarily for his appearances in television programmes. He was born and raised in Leeds, West Yorkshire.

Business
George earned his wealth running gay nightclubs and bars in Leeds. He established a memorial website called gonetoosoon.org that was popular in the mid-2000s.

Media
George and his husband Michael Rothwell featured in a 6-part fly-on-the-wall documentary titled Two Queens and a Castle.  The program was broadcast on the Bio Channel.

George has featured in three television documentaries about Michael Jackson, Secret Millionaire (Channel 4), Star Traders: The Christmas Challenge (ITV1) and Louis, Martin & Michael (BBC). 

In 2008 his home has featured on Channel 5's Britain's Best Home and was eventually voted the winner in a public vote.

Personal life
George and his partner Michael Rothwell were amongst the first couples in Britain to enter into a civil partnership in 2005.

References

External links

Terry George official site - photographs & articles
Huddersfield Examiner's columnists page
Gone Too Soon - memorial website founded by Terry George

1965 births
Living people
Businesspeople from Leeds
English LGBT people
British LGBT businesspeople